The first inauguration of Ferdinand E. Marcos as the tenth President of the Philippines occurred on December 30, 1965. The inauguration marked the beginning of the first four-year term of Ferdinand Marcos as President and second four-year term of Fernando Lopez as Vice President.

Presidency of Ferdinand Marcos
1965 in the Philippines
Marcos 1